Mallung or mallum, is a shredded vegetable Sri Lankan dish that comprises lightly cooked/sautéed greens, with fresh coconut and any number of spices and chili. Mallung is a common condiment and is eaten at almost every meal. Most meals are usually served with one or two different mallungs, which play an important part in nutrition as this is how locals got a regular vitamin intake in their diet. The word 'mallung' or 'mallum' simply means 'wilted'.

The central ingredient of mallung is a leafy green vegetable, finely shredded which is then combined with a standard set of ingredients, to enhance and support their flavour. A number of different plants are used to make it, including cassia, passion fruit leaves, watercress or water spinach leaves. In western countries leafy vegetables, such as spinach, cabbage, chard and kale are used as substitutes for traditional Sri Lankan greens. In general, this selection comprises chopped green chillies, chopped shallots, chopped curry leaves, crushed garlic, a chopped clove of garlic together with half a cup of shredded coconut for every kilogram of moist leafy greens, seasoned with turmeric, salt and pepper, powdered maldive fish and lime juice.

There are a range of bitter, medicinal and wild greens that are commonly used in mallung in Sri Lanka, with mostly the leaves of native plants used. One of the most popular mallungs is made with gotukola (Centella asiatica), other popular varieties include kankun (Ipomoea aquatica), kathurumurunga (Sesbania grandiflora) and mukunuwenna (Alternanthera sessilis). Other herbal leaves like aguna (Wattakaka volubilis), Cheilocostus speciosus and passionfruit leaves are also used in mallungs.

References 

Salads
Sri Lankan cuisine
Sri Lankan vegetable dishes
Foods containing coconut